The Jurca MJ-51 Sperocco (Special Sirocco) is a plans-built two-seat tandem aerobatic aircraft derived from the Jurca MJ-5 Sirocco.

Design and development
Encouraged by friends and previous customers, Marcel Jurca developed the MJ-51 in 1969 as an improved, higher power Sirocco. Other changes include a raised rear seat, a longer canopy and a smaller tail. Jurca said that it was his favourite two-seat design.

Three examples have been started, each varying from the basic design in collaboration with Jurca himself. Construction of the first prototype started in France in around 1981. It was to be powered by a  Lycoming AEIO-360. The builder died in 2004 and the project remains incomplete.

The second example was started in the USA in 1991. In 2021, the aircraft, registered N3LM, won the Homebuilt Plansbuilt Grand Champion Gold Lindy at EAA AirVenture Oshkosh.

The third aircraft was started in France in 1999 with a plan to install a Potez  engine. Transferred to a different builder, the design has been changed and strengthened to accommodate a  Lycoming AEIO-540 Other modifications will include a two-door canopy, a larger and more accessible rear seat, additional fuel tanks, advanced avionics and uprated brakes. The aircraft has yet to fly (October 2019).

Specifications (MJ-51)

References

External links
 Avions Marcel Jurca website

Homebuilt aircraft
Jurca aircraft
Single-engined tractor aircraft
Low-wing aircraft